Oliver James Kensdale (born 24 April 2000) is an English footballer who plays as a centre-back or central midfielder for Southend United.

Kensdale joined Colchester United's Development Centre at the age of seven and progressed to the club's Academy two years later. He was taken on as a scholar in 2016 and had his first experience of men's football on loan at Maldon & Tiptree in late 2017. He rejoined the club on loan in March 2018 and then early in the 2018–19 season prior to making his first-team debut for Colchester in November 2018. He joined Bath City on loan in October 2019, and Braintree Town on loan in October 2020.

Career
Born in Colchester, Kensdale joined the Development Centre at hometown club Colchester United aged seven. He enrolled in the club's Academy two years later. A former pupil at Colchester's St Benedict's Catholic College, he signed on as a scholar at the club in July 2016.

Kensdale joined Isthmian League North Division side Maldon & Tiptree for his first experience of men's football. He made his club debut on 30 September 2017 in the Jammers' 4–2 win against Tilbury. He made four league appearances and two appearances in the FA Trophy for the club. He played a further three games for the club on loan in March 2018.

At the end of his scholarship, Kensdale was offered a professional contract with Colchester in May 2018.

Kensdale rejoined Maldon & Tiptree in a third loan spell early in the 2018–19 season. He scored his first goal in senior football in his final appearance for the Jammers, a 3–2 win at Dereham Town on 10 November, scoring twice.

On 13 November, Kensdale made his first-team debut in Colchester's EFL Trophy game against Cambridge United. He then started in Colchester's League Two 1–1 draw with Exeter City at the Colchester Community Stadium on 24 November.

After becoming the first Colchester United player born after 2000, Kensdale signed his first professional contract on 24 December 2018, committing until summer 2021.

On 11 October 2019, Kensdale joined National League South side Bath City in a month-long loan deal. He made his debut on 12 October 2019 in Bath's 1–1 home draw with Maidstone United.

In October 2020, Kensdale joined National League South side Braintree Town, where he made his debut in their 1–0 defeat at Chippenham Town.

Colchester announced that Kensdale was one of seven under-23 players who had their contract terminated by mutual consent on 1 February 2021.

On 14 February 2021, Kensdale joined National League South side Concord Rangers.

On 31 December 2021, Kensdale joined National League side Southend United for an undisclosed fee.

Style of play
Kensdale operates centrally as either a centre-back or central midfielder. Prior to his scholarship, he refined himself into a commanding centre-back and as a leader of the defensive line.

Career statistics

References

2000 births
Living people
Sportspeople from Colchester
English footballers
Association football defenders
Association football midfielders
Colchester United F.C. players
Maldon & Tiptree F.C. players
Bath City F.C. players
Braintree Town F.C. players
Concord Rangers F.C. players
Southend United F.C. players
Isthmian League players
National League (English football) players
English Football League players